= New Plymouth Observatory =

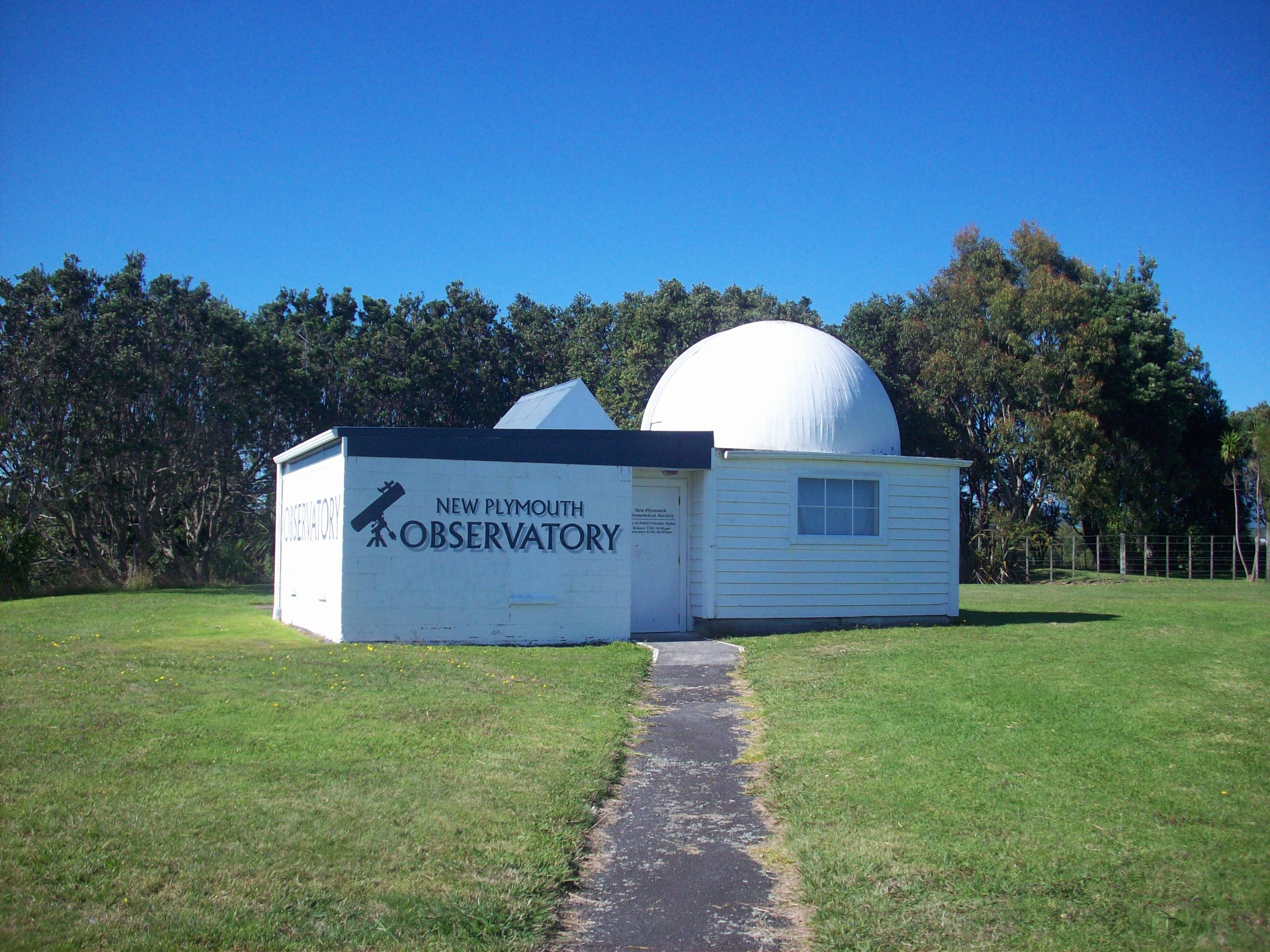
- Organization: New Plymouth Astronomical Society
- Location: Robe Street, New Plymouth, New Zealand
- Coordinates: 39.0627°S 174.0737°E
- Established: 1920
- Website: http://sites.google.com/site/astronomynp/

New Plymouth Observatory was opened in 1920 and is situated on Marsland Hill (Pūkākā), Robe Street, New Plymouth, New Zealand, and is the home of the New Plymouth Astronomical Society (NPAS).

The Society opens the Observatory to the Public, Tuesday evenings. Winter hours are 7.30-9.00pm. Summer hours are 8.30-10.00pm.
